B-cell receptor-associated protein 31 is a protein that in humans is encoded by the BCAP31 gene.

Interactions 
BCAP31 has been shown to interact with:
 APP,
 BCL2L1, 
 BCL2, 
 CASP8,  and
 VAMP3.

References

Further reading

External links